The Concept of the Political (German: Der Begriff des Politischen) is a 1932 book by the German philosopher and jurist Carl Schmitt, in which the author examines the fundamental nature of the "political" and its place in the modern world.

Historical context
The Concept of the Political was published in the last days of Weimar Germany. Schmitt joined the Nazi Party in 1933, the year after its publication.

Summary

For Schmitt, the political is reducible to the existential distinction between friend and enemy. This distinction arises from the fact of human diversity: identities and practices, beliefs and way of life can, in principle, be in conflict with one another.

Schmitt attacks the "liberal-neutralist" and "utopian" notions that politics can be removed of all warlike, agonistic energy, arguing conflict existed as embedded in existence itself, likewise constituting an ineradicable trait of anthropological human nature. Schmitt attempts to substantiate his ideas by referring to the declared anthropological pessimism of "realistic" Catholic (and Christian) theology. The anti-perfectibilist pessimism of Traditional Catholic theology Schmitt considers esoterically relevant to the inner ontological being of politics and political activity in the contemporary world, modern people subconsciously secularizing theological intellectual ideas and concerns. Schmitt criticizes political "radicals" as basically ignorant, deluded, pseudo-messianic in mentality, and oblivious to the stark, hard knowledge of unveiled human nature, its esse, encoded in ancient theology, wherein Original Sin held central, axial place, intertwining his own ideas of metapolitics with a reformulated "metaphysics of evil".

According to Schmitt, "Sovereign is he who decides on the exception" and, although the sovereign "stands outside the normally valid legal system, he nevertheless belongs to it". Sovereignty is more than the technical: it is the personal privilege of the ruler. Schmitt states: "significant concepts of the modern theory of the state are secularized theological concepts".

Publication
The Concept of the Political was first published in 1932 by Duncker & Humblot (Munich). It was an elaboration of a journal article of the same title, published in 1927. The 1932 version has significant, and controversial, revisions. However, it is likely that these revisions were made in response to the reaction of Leo Strauss.

Notes

References

External links
 Book Review: Carl Schmitt’s The Concept of the Political
 Lena Lindgren, Review of Carl Schmitt The Concept of the Political  (Review of the Swedish edition Det politiska som begrepp, Sociologisk Forskning 2011:3, pp. 114-116; translated into English)

1932 non-fiction books
Books by Carl Schmitt
Books in political philosophy
Contemporary philosophical literature
German non-fiction books
Philosophy books
Rutgers University Press books